The Royal Life Guards is a mechanized infantry regiment of the Danish Army, founded in 1658 by King Frederik III. The primary task is to provide a number of soldiers from the Guard Company to serve as a guard/ceremonial unit to the Danish monarchy, while training the Royal Guards for various functions in the mobilisation force. Until its disbandment, the Royal Horse Guards, served the role as the mounted guard/ceremonial unit, afterwards the role was taken over by Guard Hussar Regiment Mounted Squadron. During the time period 1684-1867, the Royal Life Guards were called The Royal Foot Guard, in order to distinguish between the regiment and the Royal Horse Guards.

History

Role

Organisation
The regiment itself has two battalions, the Guard Company and a Musical Corps:
  1st Battalion – Founded 1658. Mechanized Infantry Battalion, part of 1st Brigade. Plus Ultra (Even further)
  Staff Company (STKMP/I/LG)
  1st Armored Infantry Company (Army's Flank company ) (1/I/LG)
  2nd Mechanized Infantry Company (2/I/LG)
  4th Mechanized Infantry Company (4/I/LG)(inactive)
  2nd Battalion – Founded 1867. Mechanized Infantry Battalion,  Vincere Volumus (We'll be victorious)
  Staff Company (STKMP/II/LG)(inactive)
  1st Mechanized Infantry Company (1/II/LG)
  2nd Basic Training Company (2/II/LG)
  3rd Basic Training Company (3/II/LG)
  Royal Guard Company - Founded 1659. Ceremonial/guard unit.
  Royal Life Guard Music Band - Founded 1658. Musical unit.

Disbanded units 
  3rd Battalion – Founded 1923, Disbanded 2018. Infantry (basic training) Battalion. (Mechanized Infantry Battalion 2000-2004)
  4th Battalion – Founded 1961, Disbanded 2005. Infantry Battalion.
  5th Battalion – Founded 2001, Disbanded 2005. Infantry Battalion. (Merged in from 3rd Btn/Danish Life Regiment, only as reserve)
  6th Battalion – Founded 2001, Disbanded 2005. Infantry Battalion. (Merged in from 4th Btn/Danish Life Regiment, only as reserve)
  7th Battalion – Founded 2001, Disbanded 2005. Infantry Battalion. (Merged in from 4th Btn/Zealand Life Regiment, only as reserve)

Names of the regiment

Alliances
  – The Princess of Wales's Royal Regiment (Queen's and Royal Hampshires) – Bond of Friendship
  – Bundeswehr

Image gallery

See also
 Guard Hussar Regiment (Denmark)
 Guard Hussar Regiment Mounted Squadron
 Royal Horse Guards (Denmark)

References

Further reading

External links

 Official Site
 Den Kongelige Livgardes Musikkorps

Danish Army regiments
Royal guards
Guards regiments
1658 establishments in Denmark
Military units and formations established in 1658
Danish monarchy